Pendlebury is an electoral ward of Salford, England.  It is represented in Westminster by Rebecca Long-Bailey MP for Salford and Eccles. A profile of the ward conducted by Salford City Council in 2014 recorded a population of 13,434.

Councillors 
The ward is represented by three councillors:

  Sophia Linden (Lab)
 John Ferguson (Lab Co-op)
 Barry Warner (Lab)

 indicates seat up for re-election.
 indicates seat won in by-election.

Elections in 2010s

May 2018

May 2016

May 2015

May 2014

May 2012

May 2011

May 2010

Elections in 2000s

References 

Salford City Council Wards